Rissoina dyscrita is a species of minute sea snail, a marine gastropod mollusk or micromollusk in the family Rissoinidae.

Description 
The maximum recorded shell length is 6 mm.

Distribution 
This species can be found in the Caribbean Sea, the Gulf of Mexico and the Lesser Antilles. They can also be found in Eastern Florida to Lesser Antilles, and Bermuda.

Habitat 
Typically found in benthic, grazer, hard substrate, or soft substrate (muds, sands, clays) habitats.  Minimum recorded depth is 0 m. Maximum recorded depth is 4.5 m.

References 

 Rosenberg, G., F. Moretzsohn, and E. F. García. 2009. Gastropoda (Mollusca) of the Gulf of Mexico, Pp. 579–699 in Felder, D.L. and D.K. Camp (eds.), Gulf of Mexico–Origins, Waters, and Biota. Biodiversity. Texas A&M Press, College Station, Texas.

External links 
 

Rissoinidae
Gastropods described in 1990